George Ashton Oldham (August 15, 1877 – April 7, 1963) was the third bishop of the Episcopal Diocese of Albany in the United States from 1929 to 1950, during the turbulent times of the Great Depression and World War II.  He was also notable as the primary author of the catechism used in the Episcopal Church (United States) for decades until 1979.  Now largely forgotten, Oldham was a major religious leader for several decades in the middle of the 20th and a serious candidate for presiding bishop.

Early life
Oldham grew up in Cleveland, Ohio, and attended Cornell University, where he was an active debater, and graduated with an A.B. in 1902.

  He served as a chaplain at Columbia University while in seminary in 1906.  In 1908, he graduated from the General Theological Seminary with his bachelor's degree in divinity.

Marriage
Oldham was married to Emily Pierrepont Gould (born March 24, 1884 — died October 31, 1969), from a very old and wealthy family. She was noted in the Social Register of New York of 1914, among other years. She was the daughter of Mary Pierrepont Perry and James Henry Gould (1844-1896), and a direct descendant of James Pierpont, the founder of Yale University. Their society wedding was announced in the New York Tribune, which was set for January 14, 1915, to be celebrated by Bishop Greer at the Cathedral of St. John the Divine.  At the time, Oldham was rector of St. Luke's Episcopal Church at Convent Ave. and West 141st Street in Manhattan.

By coincidence, Emily Pierrepont Gould was a distant cousin of Aaron Burr through James Pierpont, while Oldham's church at the time was next to Hamilton Grange, the home of Alexander Hamilton in 1804 when Burr shot Hamilton.

Work as bishop
Oldham was elected Bishop Coadjutor of Albany in 1922, to prepare for replacing Richard Henry Nelson.

In 1924, Oldham made a major sermon, entitled "America First", at the Washington National Cathedral.  However, it was not necessarily made in support of the controversial "America First" movement:
  His sermon on "The church's responsibility for world peace" was also widely published.  He was a keynote speaker at the 1931 dedication of the War Memorial in Ithaca, New York, place of his alma mater, Cornell.

Oldham was an organizer of a conference on Anglo-Catholicism in Albany.  He was also active in ecumenism with the Roman Catholic Church, long before that became popular.

He was installed in 1929 in the cathedra in the choir at the Cathedral of All Saints, as the 3rd Bishop of Albany.  That would be a terribly unlucky year to begin any ministry, as the Great Depression was to start with the Stock Market Crash of 1929.

Oldham wrote the Catechism Today: Instructions on the Church, the catechism used in the Episcopal Church (United States) for decades until 1979.
  He also wrote a book entitled The Fighting Church.

He was very active in Episcopal Church activities, from at least 1932. In 1937, he was a serious candidate for election as presiding bishop.  By the end of the war in 1945, he was acknowledged as a church leader.  In 1947, Bishop and Mrs. Oldham attended a conference in Sydney, Australia, and on their way home from New Zealand, the seaplane pilot, in order "to avoid disaster was [forced] to jettison cargo and passengers' luggage to lighten the load."  Lost in "the Oldham luggage [was] ... the cope the bishop had worn at his consecration".

In 1949, he received an honorary degree from Hobart College.  The deanery of the Cathedral of All Saints is named Oldham House in his honor.

He retired as bishop in 1950 and died in 1963.  He was replaced by Bishop Frederick L. Barry, whose death he announced to a diocesan convention in 1960.

References

Notes

External links
 Bibliographic directory from Project Canterbury
 Cathedral of All Saints web site
 Episcopal Diocese of Albany official web site

See also

 List of Episcopal bishops (U.S.)

Anglo-Catholic bishops
Cornell University alumni
Religious leaders from Albany, New York
1877 births
1963 deaths
American Anglo-Catholics
Episcopal bishops of Albany